Robert Selby Armitage,  (28 March 1905 – 26 May 1982), sometimes known as Robert Selby, won both the George Cross and George Medal for his bomb disposal work during the Second World War, one of only eight people to have been awarded both.

Early life
The son of the Rev. Philip Armitage (1870–1960) and his wife Elizabeth Christina Armitage, née Marshall (c1875-1934), he was born in Birling in Kent on 28 March 1905 and educated at Rugby School and Trinity College, Cambridge. On 28 September 1938 he married Frances Bland Tucker.

Second World War
He defused unexploded bombs during the blitz in 1940, notably a mine that fell on Orpington in Kent.  The mine had come to rest in a tree and he climbed a ladder to defuse it, offering no chance of escape if the fuse had been triggered.  His George Cross was gazetted in the London Gazette on 27 December 1940, and he was invested on 24 May 1941 at the medal's first investiture ceremony. He was one of four recipients: one civilian and one each from the Navy, Army and Air Force.

Also in 1940, he commanded a small coaster at the evacuation of the British Army from Dunkirk.

Later life and family
On 26 May 1982, at his home in Nettlebed, Oxfordshire, he shot his wife, wounding her slightly, and then killed himself.

Armitage was a nephew of Robert Armitage, great nephew of Edward Armitage and Thomas Rhodes Armitage, and third cousin of Edward Leathley Armitage.

Citations

1905 births
1982 deaths
People from Birling, Kent
People educated at Rugby School
Alumni of Trinity College, Cambridge
Royal Navy officers
British recipients of the George Cross
Royal Navy recipients of the George Cross
Bomb disposal personnel
Royal Naval Volunteer Reserve personnel of World War II
English stockbrokers
Recipients of the George Medal
20th-century English businesspeople
1982 suicides
Suicides by firearm in England
Military personnel from Kent